Ben Laughlin played second base for the Elizabeth Resolutes, a 19th-century Major League Baseball team.

Sources
 

Major League Baseball second basemen
Year of birth missing
Year of death missing
Elizabeth Resolutes players
19th-century baseball players
Brooklyn Chelsea players
Newark Domestics players